Shooting Stars is a 1952 West German drama film directed by Hans Müller and starring Rudolf Prack, Ilse Steppat and Margot Trooger.

The film's sets were designed by Mathias Matthies and Ellen Schmidt. It was made at the Göttingen Studios and partly on location in Hamburg.

Synopsis
A small town engine driver is convinced by a nightclub owner to move to Hamburg and try his luck as a performer. His fiancée, however, becomes concerned by the life he is now leading.

Cast
 Rudolf Prack as Werner Nordhaus
 Ilse Steppat as Karena Rodde
 Margot Trooger as Herta Wernicke
 Paul Dahlke as Gerhard Sommer
 Nicolas Koline as Fedja
 Josef Sieber as Wilhelm Nordhaus
 Hermann Speelmans as Arthur Wernicke
 Käthe Haack as Hildegarde Wernicke
 Barbara Henschel as Aenne Nordhaus
 Klaus Becker as Oskar Becker
 Joachim Brennecke as Karl Ludwig Nordhaus
 Tonio von der Meden as Wölchen Nordhaus
 Horst Beck as Inspizient
 Josef Dahmen as Eisenbahner
 Karl Kramer
 Joachim Rake as Gordon
 Kurt Schwabach as Colman
 Max Walter Sieg
 Carl Voscherau as Lokführer
 Gert Niemitz

References

Bibliography 
 Hans-Michael Bock and Tim Bergfelder. The Concise Cinegraph: An Encyclopedia of German Cinema. Berghahn Books, 2009.

External links 
 

1952 films
1952 drama films
German drama films
West German films
1950s German-language films
Films directed by Hans Müller
Films set in Hamburg
German black-and-white films
1950s German films
Films shot at Göttingen Studios